Eddie "Lockjaw" Davis 4 – Montreux '77 is a 1977 live album by Eddie "Lockjaw" Davis, recorded at the 1977 Montreux Jazz Festival.

Track listing
"This Can't Be Love" (Lorenz Hart, Richard Rodgers) – 5:49
"I Wished on the Moon" (Dorothy Parker, Ralph Rainger) – 7:04
"The Breeze and I" (Tutti Camarata, Ernesto Lecuona, Al Stillman) – 7:34
"Angel Eyes" (Earl Brent, Matt Dennis) – 6:02
"Telegraph" (Eddie "Lockjaw" Davis) – 6:00
"Land of Dreams" (Norman Gimbel, Eddie Heywood) – 7:19
"Blue Lou" (Irving Mills, Edgar Sampson) – 3:34

Personnel
 Eddie "Lockjaw" Davis - tenor saxophone
 Oscar Peterson - piano
 Ray Brown - double bass
 Jimmie Smith - drums

References

Albums produced by Norman Granz
Albums recorded at the Montreux Jazz Festival
Eddie "Lockjaw" Davis live albums
1977 live albums
Pablo Records live albums